Reticulosida is an order of Cercozoa that was created by Cavalier-Smith in 2003, but subsequently emended in by Bass et al. in 2009 to include only one monotypic family, the Filoretidae.

Taxonomy
 Order Reticulosida Cavalier-Smith 2003 emend. Bass et al. 2009
 Family Filoretidae Cavalier-Smith & Bass 2009
 Genus Filoreta Bass & Cavalier-Smith 2009
 Species F. marina Bass & Cavalier-Smith 2009
 Species F. tenera Bass & Cavalier-Smith 2009
 Species F. turcica Bass & Cavalier-Smith 2009
 Species F. japonica Bass & Cavalier-Smith 2009

See also
 Gymnophryid

References

Proteomyxidea
Cercozoa orders
Monotypic SAR supergroup taxa